Hrudayanjali is a 2002 Telugu romance film directed by A. Raghurami Reddy. The film was completed in 1992 but was released in 2002 and won three Nandi awards.

Plot 
The movie begins with an interview of a celebrated actor Anand (Sanjay Mitra) by Maya (Girija). It is one of those magical moments when love is in the air.

Anand notices that for some mysterious reason, Maya, in spite of being in deep love with him, is not ready to marry him. Whenever he proposes marriage, she says that she is not eligible to marry him. One fine day she gives in to his pestering and tells him the facts of her life.

We flashback to when Maya was 16 years old. Back from school, one day she sees her uncle waiting alone for her at home. He forces himself upon her, and in doing so leaves a permanent scar in her mind.

Anand offers to marry her. They marry. Then there is a series of letdowns for Anand, since Maya will not let him have her. One day, after a major letdown, unable to bear the depression, Maya commits suicide.

Cast 
 Sanjay Mitra as Anand
 Girija Shettar as Maya

Soundtrack

Awards
Nandi Awards
 Best Cinematography - Madhu Ambat
 Best Sctreenplay Writer - A. Raghu Rami Reddy
 Third Best Feature Film -  Bronze - P. Ramanath

References

2002 films
2000s Telugu-language films
2000s romance films
Films scored by L. Vaidyanathan
Indian romance films